The Voyagers: Being Legends and Romances of Atlantic Discovery is a children's book by Padraic Colum. It comprises a mixture of legendary and historical stories about Atlantic exploration, from the story of Atlantis  to the naming of America. The book, illustrated by Wilfred Jones, was first published in 1925 and was a Newbery Honor recipient in 1926.

The voyagers are Maelduin, Saint Brendan, the children of Eric the Red, Christopher Columbus, Ponce de Leon, colonists of Virginia, and Amerigo Vespucci. Their stories are told within a framing sequence of Henry the Navigator's interest in exploration.

References

External links
 

1925 children's books
American children's books
Newbery Honor-winning works
Children's history books